Peter Shaver (September 27, 1776 – June 21, 1866) was a farmer, businessman and political figure in Upper Canada.

He was born in Montgomery County, New York in 1776, the son of a German immigrant (the family name was originally spelled Schaeffer). His father was a loyalist who served with the British forces during the American Revolution and settled in Matilda Township in Dundas County, Upper Canada after the war. Peter later served with the Dundas County Militia during the War of 1812 and reached the rank of lieutenant-colonel. He was elected to the Legislative Assembly of Upper Canada in 1820 for Dundas and was reelected in 1828 and served until 1841. He was appointed justice of the peace in the Eastern District in 1825. Shaver farmed and was also involved in the timber trade.

He died in Iroquois in 1866.

References 
Becoming Prominent: Leadership in Upper Canada, 1791-1841, J.K. Johnson (1989)

1776 births
1866 deaths
People from Montgomery County, New York
Members of the Legislative Assembly of Upper Canada
Canadian justices of the peace
People from the United Counties of Stormont, Dundas and Glengarry